The Battle of the St. Lawrence involved marine and anti-submarine actions throughout the lower St. Lawrence River and the entire Gulf of Saint Lawrence, Strait of Belle Isle, Anticosti Island and Cabot Strait from May–October 1942, September 1943, and again in October–November 1944. During this time, German U-boats sank over 20 merchant ships and four Canadian warships. There were several near-shore actions involving the drop of German spies, or the attempted pickup of escaping prisoners of war. Despite the 23 ships lost, this battle marked a strategic victory for Canadian forces as ultimately they managed to disrupt U-boat activity, protect Canadian and Allied convoys, and intercept all attempted shore operations. This marked the first time that a foreign power had inflicted casualties in Canadian inland waters since the US incursions in the War of 1812.

In the interwar years, poor economic conditions and a sense of security, engendered by the proximity of the United States and the traditional protection of the Royal Navy, had resulted in the Royal Canadian Navy (RCN) being equipped with very few ships, especially for coastal defence. Upgraded to six destroyers just before the war, Canadian naval deployment gave priority to the North Atlantic convoy routes. By the end of the war, the RCN had expanded to become the third largest allied naval power, with 400 vessels and 100,000 men and women. The Royal Navy contributed two destroyers to the fight in October 1942 when attacks reached their peak.

Historical context 

From the start of the war in 1939 until VE Day, several of Canada's Atlantic coast ports became important to the resupply effort for the United Kingdom and later for the Allied land offensive on the Western Front. Halifax and Sydney, Nova Scotia became the primary convoy assembly ports, with Halifax being assigned the fast or priority convoys (largely troops and essential material) with the more modern merchant ships, while Sydney was given slow convoys which conveyed bulkier material on older and more vulnerable merchant ships. Both ports were heavily fortified with shore radar emplacements, searchlight batteries, and extensive coastal artillery stations all manned by RCN and Canadian Army regular and reserve personnel. Military intelligence agents enforced strict blackouts throughout the areas and anti-torpedo nets were in place at the harbour entrances. Even though no landings of German personnel took place near these ports, there were frequent attacks by U-boats on convoys departing for Europe. Less extensively used, but no less important, was the port of Saint John which also saw matériel funnelled through the port, largely after the United States entered the war in December 1941. The Canadian Pacific Railway mainline from central Canada (which crossed the state of Maine) could be used to transport in aid of the war effort.

Although not crippling to the Canadian war effort, given the country's rail network to the east coast ports, but possibly more destructive to the morale of the Canadian public, was the Battle of the St. Lawrence, when U-boats began to attack domestic coastal shipping along Canada's east coast in the St. Lawrence River and Gulf of St. Lawrence from early 1942 through to the end of the shipping season in late 1944.

Spring 1942

The Kriegsmarine had made no formal plans to attack merchant shipping in the St. Lawrence River and Gulf of St. Lawrence, despite its activities off the convoy assembly ports of Halifax and Sydney, Nova Scotia; therefore, early attacks in the Battle of the St. Lawrence were considered ad hoc and opportunistic.

U-553 departed the Gulf of St. Lawrence to return to its established patrol in the North Atlantic.

The RCN's response to the attacks was to deploy five s, but it remained inadequate even with these reinforcements.

The incident revealed that the RCN did not have the resources to deal with the situation and there were political repercussions in Canada with suggestions that RCN ships allocated to the Atlantic convoys should be recalled to protect Canadian territorial waters; however, the RCN's priority remained with the protection of convoys to Britain, the Soviet Union and North Africa.

RCAF aircraft carried out operational patrols from RCAF stations such as Mont-Joli, Bagotville, Chatham, Mount Pleasant, Charlottetown, Summerside, Debert, Stanley and Sydney as well as various civilian fields, particularly in the Magdalen Islands.

Residents along the Gaspé coast and the St. Lawrence River and Gulf of St. Lawrence were startled at the sight of maritime warfare off their shores, with ships on fire and explosions rattling their communities, while bodies and debris floated ashore. The Canadian government's wartime secrecy saw censors forbid media reporting of incidents; so the only news came from local gossip. Blackouts were strictly enforced and army units were sent out on coastal patrols along roads and railway lines.

Summer 1942

In July 1942, Captain Ernst Vogelsang piloted  into the Gulf. On 6 July, within half an hour, he sank three ships from the twelve-ship convoy QS-15: the British registered Dinaric and Hainaut, and the Greek vessel Anastassios Pateras. This attack drove the submarine to the bottom where it hid for 12 hours. The submarine then rushed out of the Gulf for repairs.

In late August, two U-boats made a joint raid on the St. Lawrence.  sank nine ships and damaged another in a two-week period, escaping attacks by escort vessels each time and sinking the Flower-class corvette  on 11 September.  was less successful in attacking merchant shipping but it sank the armed yacht  and heavily damaged . Eastern Air Command positioned itself to better defend the remaining convoys by establishing a "Special Submarine Hunting Detachment" of No. 113 Squadron RCAF in Chatham, New Brunswick. He did not do much damage to the submarine, but subsequent naval and air activity in the area frustrated the U-boat's efforts to attack other convoys. The RCN requested additional forces from Western Local Escort Force, receiving two old Royal Navy destroyers with improved radar to combat the U-boat threat.

Within 24 hours of 24 September, crews from 113 Squadron registered seven sightings and three attacks on U-517. Flying Officer M.J. Bélanger, an experienced 23-year-old Quebec native who came to the squadron from duty as a flying instructor, made two of the attacks. Neither sank the U-boat. Aircraft continued to harry the submarine as it cruised the Gulf. Bélanger was in the cockpit for another attack on U-517 on 29 September. Although his depth charges exploded all around the submarine's hull, it survived yet again. Still, Bélanger's attacks had badly hurt the submarine along with some sailors inside it. Later the young airman would be awarded the Distinguished Flying Cross, in large part for his determined attack of the U-boat.

The continued attacks caused the St. Lawrence River and Gulf of St. Lawrence to be closed to all trans-Atlantic shipping, allowing only coastal trade. In practice, although this embargo strained the  Canadian National Railway (CNR) system to Sydney and Halifax, it simplified the management of Atlantic convoys. The embargo lasted until early 1944.

Fall 1942
The submarine sustained minor damage from the warships but managed to sink  by firing two torpedoes at it.

U-69 escaped a counterattack by the Bangor-class minesweeper . In November,  sank two iron ore freighters and damaged another at Bell Island in Conception Bay, Newfoundland, en route to a patrol off the Gaspé Peninsula where, despite an attack by an RCAF patrol aircraft, it successfully landed a spy, Werner von Janowski at New Carlisle, Quebec; he was captured at the New Carlisle railway station shortly after landing on the beach.

On 21 October  moved into the entrance of the river and encountered widespread RCN patrols. The submarine's captain, Hans-Joachim Schwantke, attempted to attack convoy SQ-43 off Gaspé, but was spotted and repulsed by the convoy's escorts. It was stated that six depth charges from the Bangor-class minesweeper  knocked out the U-boat's lights, blew the battery circuit breaker and activated a torpedo in one of the sub's stern tubes. The submarine was damaged but escaped the river.

In November,  was ordered in but turned away because of oppressive Canadian patrols that prevented entry.

U-boat losses experienced by the Kriegsmarine during 1942 following the entry of the United States Navy into the Battle of the Atlantic, coupled with declining German shipbuilding capability to replace battle losses, saw the U-boat fleet redeployed to the primary Atlantic convoy routes to disrupt the Allied war resupply effort; this effectively saw enemy submarines withdrawn from the St. Lawrence River and Gulf of St. Lawrence by the end of 1942.

1943
Canadian military intelligence and the Royal Canadian Mounted Police (RCMP) intercepted mail addressed to several Kriegsmarine officers (including Otto Kretschmer) imprisoned at the Camp 30 prisoner of war camp at Bowmanville, Ontario in early 1943. The correspondence detailed an escape plan in which the prisoners were to tunnel out of the camp and make their way (using currency and false documents provided for them) through eastern Ontario and across Quebec to the northeastern tip of New Brunswick off the Pointe de Maisonnette lighthouse where the escapees would be retrieved by a U-boat.

Canadian authorities did not tip off the POWs and detected signs of tunnel digging at Camp 30. All prisoners except one were arrested at the time of their escape attempt; the sole inmate who managed to escape travelled all the way to Pointe de Maisonette undetected, likely travelling onboard Canadian National Railway passenger trains to the Bathurst area. This POW was apprehended by military police and RCMP on the beach in front of the lighthouse on the night of the planned U-boat extraction.

U-536 managed to elude the RCN task force by diving just as the surface warships began attacking with depth charges; the submarine was able to escape the Gulf of St. Lawrence without making the extraction.

1944
In 1943, the RCAF had begun to successfully harass U-boat operations in Canadian coastal waters and the RCN had grown in numbers and effectiveness to allow more resources to be dedicated to anti-submarine warfare operations in territorial waters. By early 1944, the shipping lanes in the Gulf of St. Lawrence and St. Lawrence River were reopened to domestic and war-related convoys operating primarily from Quebec City to Sydney.

Late 1944 saw a resurgence of U-boat activity in the St. Lawrence River and Gulf of St. Lawrence. German submarines were being equipped with the snorkel, a telescopic engine ventilation system that permitted continuous underwater operation without surfacing.

Three weeks later, U-1228 attacked and sank the Flower-class corvette , a few kilometres off of Channel/Port aux Basque on the night of 24–25 November, with the loss of all 91 crew members, including former Toronto Maple Leafs hockey player Dudley "Red" Garrett. Authorities only realized that it sank when Caribous replacement ferry, SS Burgeo, sailed into North Sydney without Shawinigan on 26 November, after it had tried numerous times to make contact by radiophone earlier that day. Wreckage was discovered on 27 November, and six crewmen's bodies were recovered. It was the worst case of military deaths in Canadian territory during the war.

These two German attacks marked the end of the Battle of the St. Lawrence. In May 1945, following Germany's surrender,  and  surrendered to the RCN at Shelburne, Nova Scotia and Bay Bulls, Newfoundland respectively.

After the war, it was shown that the mingling of fresh and salt waters in the region (the world's largest estuary), plus temperature variations and sea ice, disrupted RCN anti-submarine operations and reduced the effectiveness of shipboard sonar systems that were designed to detect submarines. Fog and other weather conditions in the St. Lawrence River and Gulf of St. Lawrence also conspired to hamper RCAF patrols.

Order of battle

Canada
Canadian Army

Royal Canadian Navy

Frigates

 
 
 
 
 
 
  loss
 
 
 
 
 
 
 

Corvettes

 
 
 
 
 
 
  sunk
 
 
 
 
 
 
 
 
 
 
 
 
 
 
 
 
  sunk
 
 
 
 
 
 
 

Minesweepers

 
 
  sunk
 
 
 
 
 
 
 
 
 
 
 
 
 
 
 
 
 
 
 
 
 
 
 
 
 
 
 
 
 
 
 
 

Armed yachts
 
  sunk
 
 

Auxiliaries
 

Motor Launches

 HMC ML Q050
 HMC ML Q051
 HMC ML Q052
 HMC ML Q053
 ML 54
 ML 55
 ML 56
 ML 57
 ML 58
 ML 59
 ML 61
 ML 62
 ML 63
 ML 64
 ML 65
 ML 66
 ML 72
 ML 73
 ML 74
 ML 75
 ML 76
 ML 77
 ML 79
 ML 80
 ML 81
 ML 82
 ML 83
 ML 84
 ML 85
 ML 86
 ML 87
 ML 90
 ML 93
 ML 95
 ML 96
 ML 98
 ML 100
 ML 101
 ML 103
 ML 110
 ML 111
 ML 114
 ML 115
 ML 117
 ML 120
 ML 121

Royal Canadian Air Force
 
 No. 1 General Reconnaissance School
 No. 5 (Bomber-Reconnaissance) Squadron
 No. 7 Operational Training Unit
 No. 8 (Bomber-Reconnaissance) Squadron
 No. 10 (Bomber-Reconnaissance) Squadron
 No. 11 (Bomber-Reconnaissance) Squadron
 No. 113 (Bomber-Reconnaissance) Squadron
 No. 116 (Bomber-Reconnaissance) Squadron
 No. 117 (Bomber-Reconnaissance) Squadron
 No. 119 (Bomber-Reconnaissance) Squadron
 No. 130 (Fighter) Squadron
 No. 145 (Bomber-Reconnaissance) Squadron
 No. 160 (Bomber-Reconnaissance) Squadron
 No. 161 (Bomber-Reconnaissance) Squadron
 No. 162 (Bomber-Reconnaissance) Squadron

United Kingdom

 
 
 

Royal Air Force
 No. 31 Operational Training Unit RAF
 No. 31 General Reconnaissance School

Germany
Kriegsmarine

U-boats

Aftermath 
In 1999, 55 years after the battle, the Governor General of Canada unveiled a monument to commemorate the 55th anniversary of the battle. The monument was erected in Halifax, and has the names of all the sailors that were lost in the battle. The battle is remembered in other ways, too. For example, in 2005, Veterans Affairs published a book on all the events in the battle. This book and others can educate and inform the population about the role Canadians played in the Battle of the Saint Lawrence.

Popular culture
 In the Canadian TV series Bomb Girls, the battle is mentioned several times in season 2 and seen in the newspapers. It is also mentioned and has footage shown in the TV movie Bomb Girls: Facing the Enemy.

See also
 Attacks on North America during World War II
 Military history of Nova Scotia
 Convoys SG-6/LN-6
 Convoy QS-33
 Convoy SQ-36
 Convoy LN-7

References and further reading

Bibliography 
 
 
 
 
 
 
 
 
 
 
 Veterans Affairs Canada (2005). The Battle of the Gulf of St. Lawrence. Ottawa: Her Majesty the Queen in Right of Canada represented by the Minister of Veterans Affairs.

External links
 Detailed article on Battle of the St Lawrence
 Canada Remembers – The Battle of the Gulf of St. Lawrence 

U-boats
American Theater of World War II
Battle of the Atlantic
Naval battles of World War II involving Canada
Naval battles of World War II involving Germany
Battle of
Battle_of_the_St._Lawrence
Battle_of_the_St._Lawrence
Battle_of_the_St._Lawrence
Conflicts in Quebec
Conflicts in Ontario
Conflicts in Canada
Events of National Historic Significance (Canada)
Battle_of_the_St._Lawrence
Battle_of_the_St._Lawrence
Battle_of_the_St._Lawrence
Battle_of_the_St._Lawrence
Battle_of_the_St._Lawrence
Battle_of_the_St._Lawrence
Battles of World War II involving Canada
Aerial operations and battles of World War II involving Canada
Military history of Canada during World War II
St. Lawrence